Nola Bethwyn Marino (née Catalano; born 18 February 1954) is an Australian politician who has been a member of the House of Representatives since 2007, representing the Division of Forrest in Western Australia. She is a member of the Liberal Party and served as the Assistant Minister for Regional Development and Territories from 2019 until May 2022, following the appointment of the Albanese ministry. Marino previously served as Chief Government Whip from 2015 to 2019.

Early life
Marino was born in Harvey, Western Australia, and grew up in Brunswick Junction. Her father was born in the United States, while her paternal grandparents were born in Messina, Sicily; her maternal grandfather was born in Kalmar, Sweden. In 1972, she married Carmelo "Charlie" Marino, an Italian immigrant. During the Australian parliamentary eligibility crisis, it was suggested that she might be a dual citizen of Italy through her marriage. She subsequently released a statement from the Italian consulate in Perth stating that she "is not nor has ever been an Italian citizen".

Before entering politics, Marino ran a dairy farm with her husband. From 2001 to 2007, she served on the board of Dairy Western Australia, an industry lobby group. She also served as president of the Harvey Bulls Football Club for ten years. In 2017, the South West Football League announced that it would name the best and fairest award in its women's competition the Nola Marino Medal.

Politics
Marino was elected to parliament at the 2007 federal election, succeeding the retiring Geoff Prosser in the Division of Forrest. She is the first woman to represent the electorate, which was established in 1922. In February 2008, Marino was appointed by Brendan Nelson as one of the party whips in the House of Representatives, serving alongside Michael Johnson and Chief Whip Alex Somlyay.

Marino reportedly supported Malcolm Turnbull in the 2015 leadership spill against Tony Abbott. Turnbull subsequently appointed her Chief Government Whip in the House of Representatives, in place of Scott Buchholz. She was the first woman to hold the office. In the lead-up to the 2016 federal election, Marino was challenged for Liberal preselection by Ben Small, the president of the party's Bunbury branch. She won the vote 51–16, with Turnbull sending a letter of support.

After the 2019 federal election, Marino was appointed Assistant Minister for Regional Development and Territories in the Morrison Government. She consequently relinquished her position as whip. She held the position until May 2022, following the appointment of the Albanese ministry.

Marino is a member of the centre-right faction of the Liberal Party.

References

External links
 
 

1954 births
Abbott Government
Liberal Party of Australia members of the Parliament of Australia
Living people
Members of the Australian House of Representatives
Members of the Australian House of Representatives for Forrest
People from Harvey, Western Australia
Turnbull Government
Women members of the Australian House of Representatives
21st-century Australian politicians
21st-century Australian women politicians
Australian people of Sicilian descent
Australian people of American descent
Australian people of Swedish descent